Gabow's algorithm  may refer to any of several algorithms by Harold N. Gabow, including:
 Path-based strong component algorithm
 Gabow's algorithm (single-source shortest paths)